Nagovitsyno is a rural locality (a village) in Malyshevskoye Rural Settlement, Selivanovsky District, Vladimir Oblast, Russia. The population was 2 as of 2010.

Geography 
The village is located 10 km south-east from Malyshevo, 27 km south from Krasnaya Gorbatka.

References 

Rural localities in Selivanovsky District